Something Weird may refer to:

 Something Weird Video, an American film distributor company
 Something Weird (film), a 1967 American exploitation film